En-hegal, also  Enhengal (Sumerian:), was possibly an ancient ruler of the Sumerian city-state of Lagash. Only one inscription mentioning him is known, the "Tablet of En-hegal", describing a business transaction. If indeed a king of Lagash, it is estimated he would have ruled circa 2570 BCE.

The tablet with his name describes a business transaction, in which a possible King En-hegal buys land. He seems to have purchased about 1,000 hectares of land. A tentative translation of the tablet was published by George A. Barton.

See also

History of Sumer

References

Bibliography 
 Vojtech Zamarovský, Na počiatku bol Sumer, Mladé letá, 1968 Bratislava
 Plamen Rusev,  Mesalim, Lugal Na Kish: Politicheska Istoriia Na Ranen Shumer (XXVIII-XXVI V. Pr. N. E.),  Faber, 2001 (LanguageBulgarian)   [(Mesalim, Lugal of Kish. Political History of Early Sumer (XXVIII–XXVI century BC.)]

Kings of Lagash
26th-century BC Sumerian kings